Bnot HaZahav is an Israeli sitcom, based on the NBC sitcom The Golden Girls by Susan Harris. The series stars Hana Laszlo, Miki Kam, Tiki Dayan, and Rivka Michaeli.

Plot
The series follows four seniors, who share a house in Tel Aviv. The house owner is Dalia (Hana Laszlo), and with her live Ruti Golan (Miki Kam) and Shosh Ben-Basat (Tiki Dayan). In the first episode Ruti's mother, Riva Glambush (Rivka Michaeli) joins in living with the women after her nursing home was burned. In the series, the women deal with different things.

Series Overview

External links
 Official website 

Israeli television series based on American television series
Israeli television sitcoms
Channel 10 (Israeli TV channel) original programming
2011 Israeli television series debuts
The Golden Girls
Television series by ABC Studios